Many commercial ships have been named the Iowa in honor of Iowa, the 29th United States state.

 SS Iowa (1902) Harland and Wolff. WW I troop ship Artemis, cargo ship Empire Bittern sunk as  additional breakwater ship Normandy July 1944.
  was built as SS West Cadron, renamed in 1928, and sank January 12, 1936, killing 34 crew and passengers.

See also 
 
 
 

Ship names